Ian James Larnach (born 10 July 1951) is an English former footballer who played as a forward in the Football League for Darlington and in non-league football for South Shields.

References

1951 births
Living people
People from Ferryhill
Footballers from County Durham
English footballers
Association football forwards
Darlington F.C. players
South Shields F.C. (1936) players
English Football League players